Mister Jip is a fictional character appearing in American comic books published by Marvel Comics. He is an evil sorcerer, possessing a grotesque appearance and various mystical powers.

Publication history
Mister Jip has almost exclusively appeared as a villain to Cloak and Dagger, first in Strange Tales volume 3 and later in their own series with one appearance in an X-Men annual.

Creator Terry Austin recounted that "readers had obviously gotten tired of seeing Cloak and Dagger endlessly go up against drug dealers, who, let’s face it, would never pose much of a challenge to them. Characters are never more interesting than when they have a seemingly unopposable force to push against, and to that end I came up with what I hoped would be their major reoccurring arch-foe, the maniacal Mr. Jip, and his foot soldiers Night and Day."

Fictional character biography
The man who would become known as Mister Jip was born centuries ago somewhere in Asia. He roamed the world as a scholar in the pursuit of knowledge and went to Tibet to find the legendary city of Kamar-Taj. Though the city was in ruins, Jip encountered the Ancient One and became his first apprentice. As his student, Jip was instructed in the arts of benevolent magic, but unknown to his master, he sought out books of dark magic and practiced forbidden rituals to increase his own power. When the Ancient One discovered this, he cast Jip out of his service. Jip began extending his lifespan by usurping the bodies of others. These days Jip likes to think that he still did some good, as it was his example that allowed the Ancient One to recognize the signs of Baron Mordo's betrayal centuries later.

Out on his own, Jip wanted to increase his knowledge of the dark arts even further. To do so he started to extend his life at the costs of others, but these dark arts twisted and corrupted his own body into a monstrous shape. Despite his desire to dominate the world, Jip stayed hidden over the centuries and rarely revealed himself to others.

He appeared to Cloak, disguised in the host body of a store clerk. Cloak had become powerless and felt that without his powers his partner Dagger wouldn't be interested in him anymore. Jip returned his powers in exchange for a price. Jip later battled Cloak and Dagger with his thralls, Night and Day, who had powers similar to Cloak and Dagger. Jip's price for his services would turn out to be Cloak's body as his new host. Dagger was shocked that Cloak would give up his chance at a normal life and left him, but returned in time to stop Jip from taking over Cloak's body and drove him off. Jip then forced Cloak to deliver Dagger into his clutches, then imprisoned him. Jip would fight and manipulate Cloak and Dagger over the next few months, often acting through his minions Day and Night, while at other times he would act to protect them.

Through Night, Jip later fomented battle between the possessed Dagger and members of X-Factor. The plot was foiled by Cloak, but Dagger was blinded as a result. Jip was revealed as the master of the insane former priest Francis Delgado. Jip was revealed to have restored Brigid O'Reilly and made her his spy by replacing one of her eyes with one of his own.

Jip also used the X-Men as his agents once during the events of Atlantis Attacks. He repulsed an attempt by the members of the Serpent Society to steal one of his mystical artifacts. He temporarily switched the minds of the captive Dazzler and Diamondback into each other's bodies. He fomented a battle between the X-Men and the Serpent Society. However, he failed to prevent the theft of his artifact by Sidewinder and Diamondback, who turned it over to their clients Ghaur and Llyra.

Mister Jip later bargained with Doctor Doom to trade Dagger for a book of black magic in Doom's possession. Jip murdered Francis Delgado and usurped his body. As Delgado, he murdered Father Michael Bowen, Dagger's uncle, and in disguise accompanied Dagger to Latveria. Jip's attempt to deliver Dagger to Doctor Doom was foiled by Cloak, Night, Brigid O'Reilly and "Rusty" Nales. Jip restored Dagger's sight, but was seemingly destroyed by a "bullet of living darkness" formed by Night and fired by Rusty.

Powers and abilities
Mister Jip possesses vast magical abilities, especially in the realm of black magic. He has the ability to manipulate magical forces for a variety of effects, including teleportation, energy projection, physical malleability, the ability to cancel out or tamper with the magic of others, and the tapping of extra-dimensional energy by invoking entities or objects of power existing in dimensions tangential to Earth's through the recitation of spells. He can create illusions, observe other places by scrying and conjure into being mindless minions to perform simple tasks, like a flying creature that he uses as his spy. He uses a large part of these powers to mask his presence to hide himself from more powerful mages like Doctor Strange.

Jip can grant powers to others, but always asks a price in return.

His most important ability is the ability to take over a host body, adding his victim's life span to his own. To do this, he has to initiate a process where he removes the ties between his victim's body and soul and absorb the body into his own. 
This ability has several limitations though: 
 the victim must lack an "inner light" that can repel Jip. This usually means that his victims are evil men, but it can also mean that they have a link to supernatural darkness like Cloak has. 
 the victim must be unaware of the existence and intentions of Mister Jip.
 Mister Jip and the victim must be in constant physical contact during the whole process.
After the process is completed, Jip can take on the appearance of any of his former hosts, though probably only for a short time.

Jip has a grotesque misshapen humanoid form which appears to be formed of the decaying remains of various previous host bodies.

Mister Jip has a gifted intellect, and has extensive knowledge of black magical lore.

Other version
In the Ultimate Marvel imprint, a more human looking Mister Jip appears in the pages of All-New Ultimates. He is in the profession of selling narcotics and is shown working with King Cobra and Crossbones. He answers to Ecstasy and begins displaying side-effects to the narcotics due to long-term exposure to them. After Crossbones barges into a meeting demanding payment, Jip suddenly transforms into a large, terrifying, purple monstrosity and attempts to kill him and Ecstasy, but is thwarted by the New Ultimates and Terror Inc. Eventually, Bombshell creates an opening within him and Terror enters and heads to Jip's heart. Terror feeds energy to Jip ending his suffering and melting him into a pool of flesh.

In other media
On the series Cloak & Dagger in the episode "Funhouse Mirrors", when Tyrone Johnson touches an individual by the name of Kev and looks into his fears, he sees a tall black cloaked figure with a white mask. Series showrunner Joe Pokaski has stated his intention for this to be Mister Jip, should the series be renewed for a second season.

References

External links
Mister Jip on the Marvel Wikia
Mister Jip on Comic Vine

Comics characters introduced in 1987
Marvel Comics characters who can teleport
Marvel Comics characters who use magic
Marvel Comics characters with superhuman strength
Marvel Comics supervillains